Castletown Golf Links is a championship links course at Derbyhaven on the Isle of Man. Its setting on Langness Peninsula provides views of the Irish Sea from all tees, fairways, and greens. The Links was founded in originally laid out by Old Tom Morris in 1891, with Castletown Golf Club founded in 1892. Dr Alister MacKenzie made significant improvements and alterations to the course in 1913. After the war the course was updated by Mackenzie Ross.

Castletown has been independently rated within Rolex's Top 1,000 Golf Courses in the World and in 2015 was voted as the 75th Best Links in Great Britain & Ireland by National Club Golfer. It offers a 17th hole which drives "over the Irish Sea". The links has hosted, among other events, the PGA Cup (1979), Europro Tour 2002, Manx Classic Pro Am and the Duke of York Young Champions Trophy in 2003 and again in 2005.

Castletown Golf Links came under new ownership in November 2011; since then the development of a new clubhouse along with renewed equipment has resulted in significantly better course conditions and a steady increase in membership. The current professional is [Charlie Simpson] providing lessons and a great range of clothing and equipment. The restaurant at the clubhouse is called [Bay Green], is open to the public and has proven very popular with an array of fresh dishes utilising the great ingredients available on Island.

The 7th hole is named the Race Course because, a century and a half before the first ever English Derby, the Isle of Man and the then Earl of Derby also the Lord of Mann held the first ever Manx Derby there over three furlongs. The 18th hole at Castletown Golf Links overlooks the historic St. Michaels Isle, a small island joined to Langness Peninsula via a short causeway built in the mid-18th century. The island's notable features are St Michael's Chapel, dating back to the 12th century, on the south side of the island, and a circular fort built in 1540.

The [Castletown Golf Links Hotel] was sold to Dandara in 2011, who have subsequently allowed the building to fall into a state of ruin. Their planning application (17/01265/B)to build apartments has received substantial opposition from local residents. In spite of numerous efforts by the owner of the golf course to buy the property and redevelop a hotel-only development, these efforts have not been successful to date.

References

External links 
Castletown Golf Links

Golf clubs and courses in the Isle of Man